"C'est pour vivre" (meaning "It's for Living") is the second single from Celine Dion's album C'est pour toi. It was released in October 1985 in France and later that year in Quebec, Canada. The song was recorded with the choir V'là l'bon vent.   A music video was made for the C'est pour toi TV special in 1985. The French B-side included "Avec toi" but there was no follow-up album. The song was included later on the 1988 French compilation The Best Of.

Track listings and formats
Canadian 7" single
"C'est pour vivre" – 4:02
"Tu es là" – 2:43

French 7" single
"C'est pour vivre" – 3:58
"Avec toi" – 3:23

References

1985 singles
1985 songs
Celine Dion songs
French-language songs
Pop ballads
Song recordings produced by Eddy Marnay
Songs written by André Popp
Songs written by Eddy Marnay